Tomasz Sokolowski may refer to:
 Tomasz Sokołowski (born 1970), Polish footballer
 Tomasz Sokołowski (born 1977), Polish footballer
 Tomasz Sokolowski (born 1985), Polish-born Norwegian footballer
 Tomasz Sokołowski (born 1954), Polish law professor